SOSV is a venture capital firm that provides pre-seed, seed, venture and growth stage funding to startups in the technology sector. The company conducts seed accelerator programs in Asia and the United States of America.

SOSV was founded in 1995 by Sean O'Sullivan. It is headquartered in Princeton, New Jersey, with operations in Cork, Ireland, and offices in San Francisco, Shenzhen, Shanghai, Taipei, New York City, and Newark.

History
In July 2018,  then governor of New York state Mario Cuomo announced that the state would invest $25 million in an IndieBio facility in New York City.

In December 2020, TechCrunch's former COO, Ned Desmond joined SOSV as senior operating partner.
 
As of November 2021, SOSV has backed approximately 150 startups that are developing climate technologies, with a focus on the transport, supply chain, logistics, and agriculture sectors.

In September 2021, the New Jersey Economic Development Authority announced that the state was investing $25 million to establish a HAX location in Newark, New Jersey.

Investments
SOSV invests in startups that specialize in deep tech, including climate and health, as well as enterprise and consumer in emerging markets. Notable companies within its portfolio include Opentrons, Formlabs, Perfect Day, NotCo, Upside Foods, The EVERY Company, and BitMEX.

In 2020, SOSV closed its fourth fund totalling $277 million.

In 2021, SOSV closed a $100 million Select Fund.

Programmes
SOSV runs the following programmes:

dlab (New York) - an accelerator for startups working on decentralized software technology (blockchain).
HAX (formerly Haxlr8r, Shenzhen and Newark) - a development program for hardware-based startups at seed and growth stage.
IndieBio (San Francisco and New York) - a startup development program for startups operating in the life sciences sector.
Orbit Startups (formerly Chinaccelerator and MOX, Shanghai and Taipei) - focuses on high growth, early stage startups in emerging markets.

References

External links
Official website

Financial services companies established in 1995
Venture capital firms of the United States
Startup accelerators